Christian Person (born 26 December 1980 in Greifswals) was a German association footballer who last played for Greifswalder FC as a goalkeeper. He retired at the age of 38 in 2018.

Career 
He previously played for Hertha BSC, 1. FC Magdeburg, FC Carl Zeiss Jena, Dynamo Dresden and Hallescher FC. He had a trial with Scottish Premier League club Hibernian in August 2008.

References

External links
 

Living people
1980 births
German footballers
Hertha BSC II players
FC Carl Zeiss Jena players
1. FC Magdeburg players
Dynamo Dresden players
Hallescher FC players
Association football goalkeepers
2. Bundesliga players
People from Greifswald
Footballers from Mecklenburg-Western Pomerania